Awidhah Al-Aamri (born 15 March 1983) is a Saudi football player who plays as a goalkeeper .

References
http://www.slstat.com/spl2010-2011ar/player.php?id=551

1983 births
Living people
Saudi Arabian footballers
Al-Riyadh SC players
Al-Faisaly FC players
Al-Ahli Saudi FC players
Al-Diriyah Club players
Najd FC players
Afif FC players
Saudi First Division League players
Saudi Professional League players
Saudi Second Division players
Saudi Fourth Division players
Association football goalkeepers